The Christian Index may refer to:
a newspaper published by the Georgia Baptist Convention
a magazine published by the Christian Methodist Episcopal Church